= Future Retro 777 =

777
- Manufacturer: Future Retro

Technical specifications

Input/output

The Future Retro 777 is a monophonic analog synthesizer with a digital sequencer and is out of production.
